Tianjinzhan Station is a station of lines 2, 3 and 9 of the Tianjin Metro. It began operations on 1 July 2012.

References

External links

Railway stations in China opened in 2012
Tianjin Metro stations